Hulestun (also Romanized as Hūlestūn) is a village in Heyran Rural District, in the Central District of Astara County, Gilan Province, Iran. At the 2006 census, its population was 59, in 14 families.

References 

Populated places in Astara County